Bandai High School is a municipal high school located at 6-8-1 Nuttari Higashi, Chuo Ward in Niigata City, Niigata Prefecture. The school motto is, "Shall highly aspire to a new world."
Bandai High School was established in 2003.

Bandai High School Curriculum
Two courses are offered at Bandai High School. One is the General Course, also known as the, "Regular Course." The other course is divided into two categories; the English Elective Course, and the Science Elective Course. In these courses, accelerated English, and Science are taught.

2003 establishments in Japan
Educational institutions established in 2003
High schools in Niigata Prefecture
Schools in Niigata Prefecture